These are the Billboard Holiday Digital Song Sales chart number one hits from 2020 until 2023. The chart represents the top-downloaded Holiday songs, ranked by sales data as compiled by Nielsen SoundScan.

See also 
 Billboard Christmas Holiday Charts
 List of Billboard number one Holiday Digital Song Sales 2010-2019
 List of Billboard Top Holiday Albums number ones of the 2020s

References

External links 
 Current Top Holiday Digital Song Sales chart at Billboard

Billboard charts